Alexander Demandt (born 6 June 1937 in Marburg, Hesse-Nassau) is a German historian. He was professor of ancient history at the Free University of Berlin from 1974 to 2005. Demandt is an expert on the history of Rome, Late Antiquity, historiographical studies, and the links between philosophy and history.

References

1937 births
Living people
People from Marburg
People from Hesse-Nassau
20th-century German historians
Historians of ancient Rome
Academic staff of the Free University of Berlin
German male non-fiction writers
21st-century German historians